Géza Fodor (6 May 1927 in Szeged – 28 September 1977 in Szeged) was a Hungarian mathematician, working in set theory. He proved Fodor's lemma on stationary sets, one of the most important, and most used results in set theory. He was a professor at the Bolyai Institute of Mathematics at the Szeged University. He was vice-president, then president of the Szeged University. He was elected a corresponding member of the Hungarian Academy of Sciences.

1927 births
1977 deaths
Members of the Hungarian Academy of Sciences
Set theorists
20th-century Hungarian mathematicians
People from Szeged